Fernando de Vera y Zuñiga (1658 – November 9, 1638) was a Roman Catholic prelate who served as the Archbishop of Cuzco (1629–1638), Archbishop of Santo Domingo (1628–1629), and Auxiliary Bishop of Badajoz (1614–1628).

Biography
Fernando de Vera y Zuñiga was born in Mérida, Spain in 1568 and ordained a priest in the Order of Saint Augustine. On February 17, 1614, he was appointed by Pope Paul V as Auxiliary Bishop of Badajoz in Spain and Titular Bishop of Bugi. On November 13, 1628, he was appointed by the King of Spain and confirmed by Pope Urban VIII as Archbishop of the Archbishop of Santo Domingo. On March 8, 1629, he was appointed by the King of Spain and confirmed by Pope Urban VIII as Archbishop (personal title) of the Diocese of Cuzco. He served as Archbishop of Cuzco until his death on November 9, 1638.

While bishop, he was the principal Consecrator of Francisco Vega Borja, Archbishop of La Plata o Charcas.

References

External links and additional sources
 (for Chronology of Bishops) 
 (for Chronology of Bishops) 
 (for Chronology of Bishops) 
 (for Chronology of Bishops) 

1568 births
1638 deaths
Bishops appointed by Pope Urban VIII
Bishops appointed by Pope Paul V
Augustinian bishops
Roman Catholic archbishops of Santo Domingo
Roman Catholic bishops of Cusco
17th-century Roman Catholic archbishops in Peru
17th-century Roman Catholic archbishops in the Dominican Republic